Zavdiel (lit. Gift of God) is a religious moshav in southern Israel.  Located in Hevel Lakhish near Kiryat Gat, it falls under the jurisdiction of Shafir Regional Council. In 2006, it had a population of 413.

History
The village was established in 1950 by immigrants from Yemen on land that had belonged to the depopulated Palestinian  village of Hatta. Its name was taken from Nehemiah 11:14, and is the name of a priest returning from Babel.

References

Moshavim
Religious Israeli communities
Populated places established in 1950
Populated places in Southern District (Israel)
Yemeni-Jewish culture in Israel
1950 establishments in Israel